Jordan Valley Regional Council may refer to: 

 Emek HaYarden Regional Council, Israeli Regional council in the northern Jordan River Valley
 Bik'at HaYarden Regional Council, Israeli regional council in the southern Jordan River Valley

See also
 Valley Regional Council (disambiguation)